Shadow of the Thin Man is the fourth of six The Thin Man murder mystery comedy films. It was released by MGM in 1941 and was directed by W. S. Van Dyke. It stars William Powell and Myrna Loy as Nick and Nora Charles. Also, in this film their son Nick Jr. (Dickie Hall) is old enough to figure in the comic subplot. Other cast members include Donna Reed and Barry Nelson. This was one of three films in which Stella Adler appeared.

Plot
Nick and Nora Charles are looking forward to a relaxing day at a racetrack, but when a jockey accused of throwing a race is found shot to death, Police Lieutenant Abrams requests Nick's help. The trail leads to a gambling syndicate that operates out of a wrestling arena, a murdered reporter, and a pretty secretary whose boyfriend has been framed. Along the way, Nick and Nora must contend with a wild wrestling match, a dizzying day at a merry-go-round (accompanied by Nick, Jr.), and a table-clearing restaurant brawl.

Cast
 William Powell as Nick Charles
 Myrna Loy as Nora Charles
 Barry Nelson as Paul Clarke
 Louise Beavers as Stella
 Donna Reed as Molly
 Sam Levene as Lieutenant Abrams
 Alan Baxter as "Whitey" Barrow
 Henry O'Neill as Major Jason I. Sculley
 Stella Adler as Claire Porter (aka Clara Peters)
 Loring Smith as "Link" Stephens
 Joseph Anthony as Fred Macy
 Will Wright as Maguire - Nervous Ticket Seller (uncredited)
 Sid Melton as "Fingers" (uncredited)
 Adeline De Walt Reynolds as Barrow's landlady (uncredited)
 Tor Johnson as Jack the Ripper - wrestler (uncredited)
 Frankie Burke as Jockey at the races (uncredited)
 Joe Oakie as Spider Webb (uncredited)
 Lou Lubin as Rainbow Benny
 Richard Hall as Nick Jr.

Production
Frances Goodrich and Albert Hackett, the husband and wife team who wrote the first three Thin Man scripts, refused to write another one. Goodrich said: "They press you awfully hard there…when they started talking about another Thin Man, we started throwing up and crying into our typewriters. We had the nervous breakdown together, [so] we said, "let's get out of here [and] we quit". It was based on a story by Harry Kurnitz, not Dashiell Hammett, as the previous films had been, with the script written by Harry Kurnitz and Irving Brecher.

After difficulties with the previous films, author Dashiell Hammett was uninvolved in the production of Shadow or the two subsequent films in the series.

On 22 June 1941, MGM filmed exteriors for Shadow of the Thin Man in Berkeley, California, with Golden Gate Fields racetrack, which first opened on 1 February the same year, as Greenway Park. On the San Francisco–Oakland Bay Bridge, Nick and Nora Charles get "pulled over" for speeding on the upper deck of the bridge.

Box office
Shadow of the Thin Man was eagerly welcomed, coming two years after the previous outing and hitting theaters just two weeks before the attack on Pearl Harbor. It would be three years before Loy would make another film (The Thin Man Goes Home in 1945) as she left Hollywood for New York, where she volunteered for the war effort with the Red Cross, as an assistant to the director of military and naval welfare.

According to MGM records, the film earned $1,453,000 in the US and Canada and $848,000 elsewhere, resulting in a profit of $769,000.

Nick and Nora Charles film series 
This film was the fourth of six based on the characters of Nick and Nora Charles:
 The Thin Man (1934)
 After the Thin Man (1936)
 Another Thin Man (1939)
 Shadow of the Thin Man (1941)
 The Thin Man Goes Home (1945)
 Song of the Thin Man (1947)

References

External links

 
 
 
 

1941 films
1940s crime comedy films
1940s comedy mystery films
American black-and-white films
American crime comedy films
American detective films
American sequel films
Films directed by W. S. Van Dyke
Films set in San Francisco
Films about gambling
American horse racing films
Metro-Goldwyn-Mayer films
Films with screenplays by Harry Kurnitz
Films with screenplays by Irving Brecher
The Thin Man films
American comedy mystery films
1941 comedy films
1940s English-language films
1940s American films